Todd Gross is a meteorologist. He began his TV career in Rochester(WROC), Albany (WNYT), and at the short-lived Satellite News Channel in 1982. Known best for his years as a Boston meteorologist, Gross started at WNEV-TV (the present day WHDH-TV) in 1984 as a weekend meteorologist and science reporter. In that same year, he broadened and formalized the use of weather spotters on the air and introduced the "sunburn index" (a predecessor of the UV index) to the Boston area. In 1988, Gross was promoted to meteorologist for WNEV-TV's morning and weekday noon newscasts. He also appeared on the children's show Ready to Go. In 1994, Gross brought weather to the Internet through webpages, such as WeatherMan.com, Internet Chat, and Weather-watcher networks.

In August 2002, Gross was promoted to chief meteorologist at WHDH, replacing veteran Harvey Leonard who left Channel 7 for WCVB-TV.  He remained in that role until December 2005.

Before his start at WNEV/WHDH-TV, Gross worked for two years as chief meteorologist for the 6 and 11 PM weekday newscasts at WNYT in Albany, New York. Afterward, he worked briefly as a meteorologist for the Satellite News Channel in Stamford, Connecticut.

Gross was known in the Boston-area for his on-air use of actual forecasting graphics, including isobars. He also uses and works into his weathercasts astronomic terminology, such as the term "Indian Moon."

Gross currently lives in Massachusetts and does voice-overs and video on the web. He is also doing snowfall totals for snowplowing contractors and remains active as an on-call meteorologist, having covered Hurricanes Irene (August 2011), Isaac (August 2012)  and Sandy (October 2012) and Election Week coverage (November 5–9, 2012) for CNBC. He was an on-air television and radio meteorologist at KTVX ABC4 in Salt Lake City, Utah (2007-2010) and at WWLP in Springfield MA (2006) after leaving WHDH-TV) in Boston.

Other works
Gross started the "Weather Spotter Network" program at WHDH-TV, a program which he has carried over to and expanded in his own independent forecast and education website. He was also the founder and chief meteorologist for the nationwide weather service, Compu-Weather in New York City.

Gross played a role in the forecasting of the 1991 Perfect Storm.  He was played by actor Christopher McDonald in the film of the same name.

References

External links
 ToddGross.com

American television meteorologists
Living people
Television anchors from Boston
Year of birth missing (living people)